Bushwick is a 2017 American action thriller film directed by Jonathan Milott and Cary Murnion and written by Nick Damici and Graham Reznick. The film is about a former United States Navy Hospital Corpsman (Dave Bautista) and a young graduate student (Brittany Snow) who form an unlikely alliance during the invasion of their city by a mysterious, heavily armed militia. After both are injured during the fighting, they have to work together to rescue family members and escape to the United States Army's extraction point for civilians.

Plot 
Lucy, a second year graduate student in civil engineering, and her boyfriend Jose are exiting a subway in Bushwick (in Brooklyn) where they see a man on fire running down into the station. Jose runs out to see what is going on, but is immediately killed by an explosion. Lucy runs out to try to find help but gets chased by two men. They find her in a house, but the men are killed by Stupe, the owner of the house. Stupe, a combat veteran, leaves his home to try to reach his family in Hoboken. Lucy joins him as she tries to get to her grandmother's house. Along the way, Stupe gets injured and trains Lucy in giving first aid and shooting a gun.

When they reach Lucy's grandmother's home, they find her already dead because of heart failure. As mercenaries infiltrate the home, the two escape and retreat to Belinda's, Lucy's sister. Drugged up, Belinda does not realize what is going on until a mercenary breaks into the home. Stupe subdues the soldier and asks him at gunpoint to explain what is going on. The mercenary reveals that Texas is seceding from the United States and has partnered with other Southern states (Louisiana, Florida, North Carolina, South Carolina, West Virginia and Georgia with parts of Maryland and Pennsylvania also) to form the New American Coalition, with militias to infiltrate US areas, including Bushwick, for insurgency. However, they did not expect the armed resistance from the neighborhood. Stupe convinces the mercenary to reveal the DMZ, where the US Army is extracting non-combatants: Grover Cleveland Park. Stupe knocks out the mercenary and the trio begin to make their way to the park.

Along the way, they encounter James and his mother in their building. James' mother blackmails Stupe and Lucy into going to the local church where evacuees are hiding and convincing the parish priest to meet up at a local laundromat to arm everyone to fight back as they head to the DMZ. James and his mother keep Belinda hostage to ensure Stupe and Lucy comply. Stupe and Lucy make it to the church, but when they find the priest, he shoots himself. Lucy then tells everyone to meet up at the laundromat to get guns to fight back with.

As Stupe and Lucy wait for James to arrive with Belinda, they briefly talk about their lives before the war. Stupe reveals that his family had actually died during the September 11 attacks, and he had told Lucy he was going to Hoboken just to try to get rid of her but is glad she stayed with him. As Stupe heads off to the washroom, he is mistakenly shot and killed by a scared teenage girl hiding inside. James arrives with Belinda and they head out for the attack.

They reach the DMZ, but it is heavily guarded by the mercenaries. As the resistance fights back, Lucy and Belinda stick together and run towards the helicopters. Belinda gets shot in the leg and Lucy runs over to her. As Lucy tries to drag Belinda, Lucy is shot in the head and killed. Belinda cries in horror as members of the resistance carry her away. The final shot of smoke shows that the rest of New York City has been under attack as well.

Cast 
 Dave Bautista as Stupe
 Brittany Snow as Lucy
 Angelic Zambrana as Belinda
 Jeff Lima as Gregory
 Paco Lozano as Priest
 Christian Navarro as Eduardo
 Arturo Castro as Jose
 Jeremie Harris as JP
 Myra Lucretia Taylor as Ma
 Alex Breaux as Lt. Brewer

Production 
On March 4, 2015, it was announced that Jonathan Milott and Cary Murnion would direct the disaster action thriller film Bushwick based on the script by Nick Damici and Graham Reznick, while producers would be XYZ Films' Nate Bolotin and Bullet Pictures' Adam Folk. Jane Levy was attached to play the female lead role of Lucy. On September 9, 2015, Dave Bautista also joined the film to play a war veteran Stupe. He and Lucy meet during a military invasion of Brooklyn and they decide to cross five blocks of Bushwick to reach the safe zone. On November 4, 2015, Brittany Snow was cast in the film replacing Levy to play her role Lucy. The score was composed by rapper and producer Aesop Rock. Lakeshore Records has released the soundtrack.

Principal photography on the film began early December 2015 in Brooklyn, New York City.

Reception

Critical response
On review aggregator Rotten Tomatoes, the film has an approval rating of 47% based on 72 reviews, with an average rating of 5.44/10. The site's critical consensus reads, "Bushwicks sociopolitical subtext gives it more heft than the average action thriller, but those ideas are given short shrift in what amounts to a disappointing shoot-'em-up." On Metacritic, the film has a weighted average score of 44 out of 100, based on reviews from 24 critics, indicating "mixed or average reviews".

Simon Crook for Empire praised the film calling it a brilliant B-movie with a political punch and called for a sequel. Geoff Berkshire at Variety wrote that "Even if the low-budget execution is uneven at times, there’s enough snap to the filmmaking, and enough raw power in the premise, to make for solid B-movie excitement. Chuck Bowen of Slant Magazine called it a "a genre film with a refreshing sense of political infrastructure".

References

External links 
 
 

2017 action thriller films
2017 films
American action thriller films
American disaster films
Films set in Brooklyn
Films set in Queens, New York
Films shot in New York City
One-shot films
2010s English-language films
Films directed by Jonathan Milott and Cary Murnion
2010s American films